The Wool Hall is a historic building in St Thomas Street, Redcliffe, Bristol.

History
The wool trade had been important in Bristol since the 11th century, but the smell generated by fullers softening wool in urine meant the trade was banished from the city centre and relocated in Redcliffe.

The building was constructed in 1830 to house the city's wool market, as Bristol Bridge had become too congested by sheep farmers travelling across it. It was designed by Richard Shackleton Pope and has been described as "the first quasi-industrial building in Bristol to attempt a real architectural facade". It was designed in a classical style with a symmetrical front. Internally, the building included a Pennant-flagged ground floor and staircase. The ground floor served as a weighing house, while the upper floors were used for storage. The total cost was £4,400 (now £). The building was not a success since it was too far from the farmer's markets at Temple Meads, and the wool trade moved to the Corn Exchange in 1834.

The building survived the bombing of Bristol during World War II, unlike several nearby 17th-century buildings which were hit and subsequently demolished. In 1980, the building was modified to include new doors. The ground floor became the Fleece and Firkin brewpub, while the upper floors were offices. The Fleece became a venue for live music, hosting gigs by Oasis, Pulp, Emeli Sande, Radiohead and Amy Winehouse.

The Wool Hall was awarded grade II listed building status by English Heritage in 1975.

See also
 Grade II listed buildings in Bristol
 Firkin Brewery

References 

Music venues in Bristol
Commercial buildings completed in 1830
Industrial buildings completed in 1830
1830 establishments in England
Grade II listed buildings in Bristol
Grade II listed commercial buildings
Grade II listed industrial buildings
Byzantine Revival architecture in the United Kingdom